Orthocabera sericea is a species of moth of the family Geometridae first described by Arthur Gardiner Butler in 1879. It is found from the Himalayas to Taiwan and Japan.

The wingspan is 23–30 mm.

Subspecies
Orthocabera sericea sericea (Japan)
Orthocabera sericea brunneiceps Warren, 1893

References

Moths described in 1879
Abraxini
Moths of Japan